John Usher may refer to:

John Palmer Usher (1816–1889), American administrator
John Usher (academic) (1945–2008), British legal writer and academic
John Usher (colonist) (1642–1722), colonial administrator; lieutenant governor of New Hampshire
John Usher (cricketer) (1859–1905), English cricketer

See also
John Ussher (disambiguation)
Usher (disambiguation)